is a district of Chiyoda, Tokyo, at the south-east corner of the ward bordering with Chūō and Minato.
Uchisaiwaichō Station on the Toei Mita Line is located in the area. Parts of the Hibiya Station and Shimbashi Station are also located in the neighborhood.

Etymology
In the late Edo period, the present-day Uchiwaisaichō area was a part of the Hibiya area with many daimyōs mansions and was located within the outer moat of the Edo Castle.

It was the original home of the Tokyo National Museum.

Businesses 

Amundi Japan
China Airlines
Ernst & Young ShinNihon LLC
Fukoku Mutual Life Insurance
Imperial Hotel
JFE Steel
Kroll Inc.
Mizuho Bank
NTT Communications
Shinsei Bank
Tokyo Electric Power Company (TEPCO)

Before Yamato Life declared bankruptcy, its headquarters was in Uchisaiwaichō.

Education
 operates public elementary and junior high schools. Chiyoda Elementary School (千代田小学校) is the zoned elementary school for Uchisaiwaichō 1-2 chōme. There is a freedom of choice system for junior high schools in Chiyoda Ward, and so there are no specific junior high school zones.

References

Districts of Chiyoda, Tokyo